Ranunzio Prata was an Italian painter. He was born in Milan, and painted in Pavia around 1635. He may be the author of an altarpiece at San Francesco, Brescia.

References

17th-century Italian painters
Italian male painters
Italian Baroque painters
Painters from Milan
Year of death unknown
Year of birth unknown